Orchidée is software developed by IRCAM as a computer-aided orchestration tool.

It is a MATLAB-based application that communicates with traditional computer-aided composition environments through Open Sound Control messages. This means that it can be effectively controlled from programs like Max/MSP or OpenMusic. It was developed by Grégoire Carpentier and Damien Tardieu during their PhD studies at IRCAM, with the help and supervision of composer .

A recent example of its use for orchestral composition were in Jonathan Harvey's Speakings, premiered in 2008, in which speech was analyzed and computed to provide orchestral combinations for the composer. Given an input target sound, Orchidée creates a musical score which imitates the sound using a mixture of traditional instruments. It then searches within a large instrument sample database for combinations of sounds that perceptually match the target. The application takes into account complex combinatorial possibilities, considering virtually infinite sets of different sounds created by the orchestra. It also considers musical attributes such as instruments and dynamics, and perceptual attributes as brightness and roughness. For example, in Speakings, a mantra ("Oh/Ah/Hum") was analyzed and imputed into Orchidée, which in turn generated different possibilities for orchestration. This mantra was then developed throughout the piece using such possibilities.

Other musical works using Orchidée:

 Daniel Fígols Cuevas, Kaala, 2012, CNSMDP, Paris
 Marc Garcia Vitoria, Mimesis, 2011, Paris
 Alec Hall, Striped Noise, New York, 2011
 Javier Torres Maldonado, Un posible dia, Paris, 2011
 Marc Garcia Vitoria, The P Extensions, 2010, Geneva
 Christopher Trapani, Cognitive Consonance, Le 104, 2010, Paris
 Christopher Trapani, Westering, Carnegie Hall, New York, 2010
 Marco Suarez Cifuentes, Poetry for //dark-/ dolls, 2009, IRCAM, Paris
 Fernando Villanueva Carretero, Bukowski Madrigals, 2009, IRCAM, Paris
 Kenji Sakai, Astral/Chromoprojection, 2009, IRCAM, Paris
 Gérard Buquet, L'Astre échevelée, 2009, IRCAM, Paris
 Miguel Farías, Mambo Lines, 2011, Geneva

See also
 List of music software

References

External links
 
 "Chance Music with Jonathan Harvey", interview by Bob Shingleton. Future Radio, 5 September 2010.

Audio programming languages
Music notation file formats
Music software